The following is a list of notable events and releases of the year 1913 in Norwegian music.

Events

Deaths

 April
 20 – Theodor Løvstad, musician, magazine editor and revue writer (born 1843).

Births

 March
 9 – Beate Asserson, mezzo-soprano opera singer (died 2000).

 July
 5 – Eline Nygaard Riisnæs, pianist and musicologist (died 2011).

 December 
 21 – Amalie Christie, pianist (died 2010).

See also
 1913 in Norway
 Music of Norway

References

 
Norwegian music
Norwegian
Music
1910s in Norwegian music